Laïd Bouneb (born 8 November 1972) is an Algerian boxer. He competed in the men's light welterweight event at the 1992 Summer Olympics.

References

External links
 

1972 births
Living people
Algerian male boxers
Olympic boxers of Algeria
Boxers at the 1992 Summer Olympics
Place of birth missing (living people)
Light-welterweight boxers
21st-century Algerian people
20th-century Algerian people